The 2023 Porsche Carrera Cup Scandinavia will be the 20th Porsche Carrera Cup Scandinavia season. It will begin on 12 May at Anderstorp Raceway and will end on 23 September at Mantorp Park. For the first time, Porsche Carrera Cup Scandinavia will go to the Circuit de la Sarthe, Le Mans along with Porsche Carrera Cup France. The championship is primarily made up of the Porsche 911 GT3 Cup (Type 992) with Porsche Carrera Cup Scandinavia featuring the Pro-Am Cup for the first time, replacing the previous Masters' Cup and Porsche Approved Cup.

Entry list

Results

Championship standings 
Race format

Race 1 is a 20-minute + 1 lap race being set by the results of Q1. Race 2 is a 30-minute + 1 lap race with 11th and below being set by Q1 results and the top 10 being set by a top-ten shootout in Q2. If there are three races, Q1 sets the grid for Race 1 and Race 2 with Q2 setting the grid for Race 3.

Scoring system

Drivers' Championship 
Those highlighted in blue are Pro-Am entries.

Pro-Am Cup

Teams' Championship

References

External links 

Porsche Carrera Cup Scandinavia
Porsche Carrera Cup Scandinavia
Porsche Carrera Cup seasons